Epimimastis escharitis is a moth in the family Gelechiidae. It was described by Edward Meyrick in 1916. It is found in Sri Lanka.

The wingspan is about 19 mm. The forewings are rather dark brown with the costal edge suffused with fulvous ochreous on the median third and with two blackish dots transversely placed on the end of the cell. The hindwings are rather dark grey.

References

Epimimastis
Moths described in 1916